Robert Archibald Shaw (9 August 1927 – 28 August 1978) was an English actor, novelist, playwright and screenwriter. Beginning his career in theatre, Shaw joined the Shakespeare Memorial Theatre after the Second World War and appeared in productions of Macbeth, Henry VIII, Cymbeline, and other Shakespeare plays. With the Old Vic company (1951–52), he continued primarily in Shakespearean roles. In 1959 he starred in a West End production of The Long and the Short and the Tall.

Shaw was nominated for an Academy Award and a Golden Globe for his role as Henry VIII in the drama film A Man for All Seasons (1966). His other film roles included the mobster Doyle Lonnegan in The Sting (1973) and the shark hunter Quint in Jaws (1975). He also played roles in From Russia with Love (1963), Battle of Britain (1969), Young Winston (1972), The Taking of Pelham One Two Three (1974), Robin and Marian (1976), and Black Sunday and The Deep, both of which were released in 1977.

Early life
Robert Archibald Shaw was born on 9 August 1927 at 51 King Street in Westhoughton, Lancashire, the son of former nurse Doreen Nora (née Avery), who was born in Piggs Peak, Swaziland, and Thomas Archibald Shaw, a doctor of Scottish descent. He had three sisters named Elisabeth, Joanna, and Wendy, and one brother named Alexander. When he was seven years old, the family moved to Scotland, settling in Stromness, Orkney. His father killed himself when Shaw was 12, and the family then relocated to Cornwall, where Shaw attended the independent Truro School. For a brief period, he was a teacher at Glenhow Preparatory School in Saltburn-by-the-Sea in the North Riding of Yorkshire, before attending the Royal Academy of Dramatic Art in London, graduating in 1948.

Acting career

Early career

Shaw began his acting career in theatre, appearing in regional theatre throughout England. He played Angus in a production of Macbeth at Stratford in 1946. He played at Stratford for two seasons.

In 1947, he appeared in The Cherry Orchard on British TV; also for that medium, he performed scenes from Twelfth Night and Macbeth.

He had a small part in The Lavender Hill Mob (1951), playing a police laboratory technician towards the end of the film; the following year he made his London debut, in the West End, at the Embassy Theatre in Caro William. That year he appeared on TV in A Time to Be Born (1952). He returned to Stratford in 1953.

Shaw had small roles in The Dam Busters (1955), a TV version of The Scarlet Pimpernel (1956), the films Doublecross (1956) and A Hill in Korea (1956) (alongside other young actors like Michael Caine), and a TV version of Hindle Wakes (1957).

The Buccaneers
Shaw became a TV star in the UK when he starred as Captain Dan Tempest in The Buccaneers (1956–57) which ran for 39 episodes.

He was by this time a TV leading man, having lead roles in TV films such as Success (1957) and a TV version of Rupert of Hentzau (1957). He had a big stage success with The Long and the Short and the Tall on the West End in 1959, directed by Lindsay Anderson, a performance which was filmed for television (though Shaw did not appear in the feature film version).

Shaw had small roles in Sea Fury (1958) and Libel (1959) and guest-starred on William Tell, ITV Television Playhouse, The Four Just Men, and Danger Man. He was also appearing in TV plays like The Dark Man, Misfire and The Train Set.

In 1961, he appeared in a Broadway production of Harold Pinter's The Caretaker alongside Donald Pleasence and Alan Bates. Shaw replaced Peter Woodthorpe, who had performed with the others on stage in London. It ran for 165 performances. He had good roles in The Valiant, a war film, and Tomorrow at Ten (both 1962), a thriller. Shaw played the leads in TV versions of The Winter's Tale and The Father (both 1962). He, Pleasence, and Bates reprised their performances in a film version of The Caretaker (1963); Shaw was part of the consortium who helped finance the latter.

Writing
Shaw's first novel, The Hiding Place, published in 1960, received positive reviews. His second novel The Sun Doctor (1961), was awarded the Hawthornden Prize in 1962.

Film fame
Shaw became well known as a film actor when cast as assassin Donald "Red" Grant in the second James Bond film, From Russia with Love (1963). For TV he adapted and appeared in a production of A Florentine Tragedy (1963), and was Claudius in Hamlet at Elsinore (1964) with Christopher Plummer. He played the title role in The Luck of Ginger Coffey (1964), shot in Canada alongside Mary Ure, who became his second wife. He had a role in A Carol for Another Christmas (1964). Shaw later said of his early career, "I could have been a straight leading man but that struck me as a boring life."

In 1964, Shaw returned to Broadway in a production of The Physicists directed by Peter Brook but it ran for only 55 performances. "I want very much to avoid doing bad commercial pictures for lots of money", he said. "It's difficult to avoid with six kids and two wives." Shaw then embarked on a trilogy of novels – The Flag (1965), The Man in the Glass Booth (1967) and A Card from Morocco (1969). He also adapted The Hiding Place into a screenplay for the film Situation Hopeless... But Not Serious starring Sir Alec Guinness.

Shaw was the relentless Wehrmacht panzer commander Colonel Hessler in Battle of the Bulge (1965), produced by Philip Yordan; a young Henry VIII in A Man for All Seasons (1966), which earned him a nomination for the Golden Globe Award and the Academy Award for Best Supporting Actor; General George Armstrong Custer in Custer of the West (1967), again for Yordan; Martin Luther in Luther (a 1968 film made for television); and top billed in another film version of Pinter, The Birthday Party (1968), directed by William Friedkin.

The Man in the Glass Booth
His play The Man in the Glass Booth was a success in London in 1967. It transferred to Broadway the following year and was a hit, running for 264 performances. His adaptation for the stage of The Man in the Glass Booth gained him the most attention for his writing. The book and play present a complex and morally ambiguous tale of a man who, at various times in the story, is either a Jewish businessman pretending to be a Nazi war criminal, or a Nazi war criminal pretending to be a Jewish businessman. The play was quite controversial when performed in the UK and the US, some critics praising Shaw's "sly, deft and complex examination of the moral issues of nationality and identity", others sharply critical of Shaw's treatment of such a sensitive subject.

Shaw was one of many stars in Battle of Britain (1969), with the role of Sailor Malan written specifically for him. He had the lead in The Royal Hunt of the Sun (1969) and Figures in a Landscape (1970); his fee for the latter was reportedly $500,000. In 1970, Shaw returned to Broadway playing the title role in Gantry, a musical adaptation of Elmer Gantry which ran for just one performance, despite co-starring Rita Moreno. His play Cato Street, about the 1820 Cato Street Conspiracy, was produced for the first time in 1971 in London. He appeared in Old Times on Broadway in 1971.

As an actor he appeared in A Town Called Bastard (1971), a spaghetti Western; Young Winston (1972), as Lord Randolph Churchill; A Reflection of Fear (1972); The Hireling (1973); had a cameo in The Golden Voyage of Sinbad (1973); played mobster Doyle Lonnegan in The Sting (1973), a huge hit; was the subway-hijacker and hostage-taker "Mr. Blue" in The Taking of Pelham One Two Three (1974). "Most of the time about 50 times larger than the part", he later said.

He made his final appearance on Broadway, in a production of Dance of Death, in 1974.

The Man in the Glass Booth was further developed for the screen, but Shaw disapproved of the resulting screenplay and had his name removed from the credits. However, he viewed the completed film before its release and asked to have his name reinstated. In 2002, director Arthur Hiller related Shaw's initial objection to the screenplay and his subsequent change of heart:When we decided that we needed more emotions in the film and leaned it towards that, we tried, obviously, to be honest to Robert Shaw, to keep that intellectual game-playing, but to create more of an emotional environment. And Robert Shaw became very disturbed. He did not like the idea and indeed, if you will watch the film, you will see that his name does not appear in the credits, nor does it even say, "based on the play, The Man in the Glass Booth" because he wouldn't let us do it. He just didn't like the idea until he saw the film. Then he phoned Eddie Anhalt, the screenwriter, and congratulated him because he thought it was—just kept the tone he wanted and did it so well. And he phoned Mort Abrahams the Executive Producer to see if he could get his name put on the final credits. But it was too late to restore his name, all the prints were all made.

Film stardom
Shaw achieved his greatest film stardom after playing the shark-obsessed fisherman Quint in Jaws (1975), although he was at first reluctant to take the role since he did not like the book, but decided to accept at the urging of both his wife, actress Mary Ure, and his secretary—"The last time they were that enthusiastic was From Russia with Love. And they were right."

Shaw then appeared in End of the Game (1975); Diamonds (1975), because "I wanted to play a wonderfully elegant Englishman"; Robin and Marian (1976) as the Sheriff of Nottingham opposite Audrey Hepburn (Maid Marian) and Sean Connery (Robin Hood); Swashbuckler (1976); playing the lighthouse keeper and treasure-hunter Romer Treece in The Deep (1977), for which his fee was $650,000; and as Israeli Mossad agent David Kabakov in Black Sunday (1977).

During filming Force 10 from Navarone (1978) Shaw said "I'm seriously thinking that this might be my last film... I no longer have anything real to say. I'm appalled at some of the lines... I'm not at ease in film. I can't remember the last film I enjoyed making." He made one more film, Avalanche Express (1979). Shaw and director/producer Mark Robson both died of heart attacks during post-production within months of each other; Robson in June 1978 and Shaw in August 1978. Shaw said he would use the proceeds from the film to pay off his taxes, then focus on writing and making the "occasional small film".

Personal life
Shaw was married three times and had 10 children, two of whom were adopted. His first wife was Jennifer Bourke from 1952 to 1963, with whom he had four daughters. His second wife was actress Mary Ure from 1963 to 1975, with whom he had four children, including daughters Elizabeth (born 1963) and Hannah (born 1965). He adopted son Colin (born 1961) from his wife's previous marriage to playwright John Osborne; according to an interview with Colin, he was Shaw's son born during an affair while Ure was still married to Osborne. Shaw's son Ian (born 1969) also became an actor. This marriage ended with Ure's death from an overdose. His third and final wife was Virginia Jansen from 1976 until his death in 1978, with whom he had one son, Thomas; he also adopted her son, Charles, from a previous relationship. Shaw's grandson (via his daughter Deborah and film producer Evzen Kolar)  is American musician and composer Rob Kolar. Another grandson of his, Ferdia Shaw, made his debut in the film Artemis Fowl.

For the last seven years of his life, Shaw lived at Drimbawn House in Tourmakeady, County Mayo, Ireland. Like his father, Shaw was an alcoholic for most of his life.

Death 
Shaw died in Ireland at the age of 51 from a heart attack on 28 August 1978, while driving from Castlebar, County Mayo, to his home in Tourmakeady. He suddenly became ill, stopped the car, stepped out, then collapsed and died on the roadside. He was accompanied by his wife Virginia and his son Thomas at the time. He was rushed to Castlebar General Hospital, where he was pronounced dead. He had just completed acting in the film Avalanche Express. His body was cremated and his ashes scattered near his home in Tourmakeady. A stone memorial to him was unveiled there in his honour in August 2008.

Tributes
Shaw has a Wetherspoons pub named after him in his birthplace of Westhoughton.

Villain Sebastian Shaw from the X-Men comics is named and modelled after Shaw.

Film director Ridley Scott, in the DVD commentary for Gladiator (2000) when discussing the casting of Próximo and Marcus Aurelius, said "We have very few Robert Shaws now",  implying he had wanted to cast a certain type of rugged actor that Shaw typified, in this case Oliver Reed and Richard Harris.

Work

Stage
 The Caretaker (1962)
 The Physicists (1964)
 The Man in the Glass Booth (1968)
 Gantry (1970)
 Old Times (1971)
 The Dance of Death (1974)

Filmography

 The Cherry Orchard (1947)
 The Lavender Hill Mob (1951) – Chemist at Police Exhibition (uncredited)
 The Dam Busters (1954) – Flight Sgt. J. Pulford
 Double Cross (1956) – Ernest
 A Hill in Korea (1956) – Lance Corporal Hodge
 Sea Fury (1958) – Gorman
 Libel (1959) – First Photographer
 The Dark Man (TV, 1960) – Alan Regan
 The Valiant (1962) – Lieutenant Field
 The Father (1962) – The Captain
 Tomorrow at Ten (1962) – Marlowe
 The Caretaker (1963) – Aston
 The Cracksman (1963) – Moke
 From Russia with Love (1963) – Donald 'Red' Grant
 The Luck of Ginger Coffey (1964) – Ginger Coffey
 Battle of the Bulge (1965) – Col. Martin Hessler
 A Man for All Seasons (1966) – King Henry VIII
 Custer of the West (1967) – Gen. George Armstrong Custer
 Luther (TV, 1968) – Martin Luther
 The Birthday Party (1968) – Stanley Webber
 Battle of Britain (1969) – Squadron Leader "Skipper"
 The Royal Hunt of the Sun (1969) – Francisco Pizarro
 Figures in a Landscape (1970) – MacConnachie (also adapted for the screen)
 A Town Called Bastard (a.k.a. A Town Called Hell) (1971) – The Priest
 Young Winston (1972) – Lord Randolph Churchill
 A Reflection of Fear (a.k.a. Labyrinth) (1973) – Michael
 The Hireling (1973) – Steven Ledbetter
 The Golden Voyage of Sinbad (1973) – The Oracle of All Knowledge (uncredited)
 The Sting (1973) – Doyle Lonnegan
 The Taking of Pelham One Two Three (1974) – Mr. Blue – Bernard Ryder
 Jaws (1975) – Quint
 The Man in the Glass Booth (1975) – Writer only
 End of the Game (a.k.a. Der Richter und sein Henker, Murder on the Bridge, Deception, and Getting Away with Murder) (1975) – Richard Gastmann
 Diamonds (a.k.a. Diamond Shaft) (1975) – Charles / Earl Hodgson
 Robin and Marian (1976) – Sheriff of Nottingham
 Swashbuckler (a.k.a. Scarlet Buccaneer) (1976) – Ned Lynch
 Black Sunday (1977) – Major David Kabokov
 The Deep (1977) – Romer Treece
 Force 10 from Navarone (1978) – Major Keith Mallory
 Avalanche Express (1979) – General Marenkov (shot in 1978; final film role)

Television

Writing
 The Hiding Place (1960)
 The Sun Doctor (1961) Awarded the Hawthornden Prize in 1962
 The Flag (1965)
 Situation Hopeless... But Not Serious (screenplay adaptation of The Hiding Place, 1965)
 The Man in the Glass Booth (1967)
 The Man in the Glass Booth (play adaptation, 1968)
 A Card from Morocco (1969)
  Figures in a Landscape  (1970) (screenplay adaptation of novel)
 Cato Street (play, 1971)

Awards
At the 39th Academy Awards, Shaw became the second actor to receive an Oscar nomination for portraying Henry VIII of England, in the film A Man for All Seasons (1966). He was also nominated to the 24th Golden Globe Awards for the same role.

References

External links
 
 Robert Shaw at the British Film Institute
 
 Robert Shaw – For All Seasons
 
 

1927 births
1978 deaths
20th-century English dramatists and playwrights
20th-century English male actors
20th-century English male writers
20th-century English novelists
Actors from Bolton
Alumni of RADA
British expatriate male actors in the United States
British people of English descent
English expatriates in Ireland
English male dramatists and playwrights
English male film actors
English male novelists
English male Shakespearean actors
English male television actors
English people of Scottish descent
English people of Swazi descent
Male actors from Lancashire
People educated at Truro School
People from Orkney
People from Westhoughton